The Fiat 2401 Cansa is an Italian trolleybus produced by Fiat.

History
The production of the trolleybus started in 1953. Fiat build this vehicle to satisfy the needs of the Italian trolleybus system. The bus had 21 seats and in total can take 70 people. The length of Fiat 2401 Cansa is 10,5 m and it had 2 special looking doors. There was a luggage space in the back of the trolleybus.

Transport system
Used in:
 Ancona, ATMA - 5 vehicles
 Avellino, SFI - 4 vehicles
 Bologna, ATC - 10 vehicles
 Cagliari, STS - 6 vehicles
 Livorno, ATAM - 4 vehicles
 Modena, AMCM - 2 vehicles
 Parma, AMETAG - 16 vehicles
 Rimini, ATAM - 3 vehicles
 Turin, ATM - 12 vehicles

Fiat buses
Trolleybuses